Steven Brand (born 26 June 1969) is a Scottish actor. His feature debut was The Scorpion King (2002), where he portrayed Memnon. He has had many guest appearances on television series, and in 2015, Brand was nominated Best Guest Starring Role on Television at the Saturn Awards for his performance in Teen Wolf. 

The upcoming Joe Baby (2023) is set to be Brand's feature directorial debut. He previously directed a television film.

Career
Steven Brand was born on 26 June 1969 in Dundee, Scotland. After several minor roles in television series, Brand made his feature film debut in The Scorpion King (2002). He starred as Memnon, the main antagonist, alongside Mathayus (Dwayne Johnson). Brand also voiced Alexander Anderson and Richard Hellsing in the English dubs of Hellsing and Hellsing Ultimate.

Brand played lawyer Ned Baker in Saving Lincoln (2013), before starring in the horror film Echoes the following year. In 2015, Brand was nominated Best Guest Starring Role on Television at the Saturn Awards for his performance in Teen Wolf as Dr. Gabriel Valack. He has narrated over fifty audiobooks.

Brand directed the television film He’s Watching for MarVista Entertainment. He portrayed Marsh in "24/7", the fifth episode of The Sandman (2022).

Brand directed and produced the upcoming noir film Joe Baby, starring Dichen Lachman, Willa Fitzgerald, Harvey Keitel and Ron Perlman, in his directorial debut. Based on a novel by Drew Fine, it is set for a 2023 release. After production in Mississippi ended in June 2022, Brand signed on to appear in the upcoming Saw X (2023) in an undisclosed role. He is represented by Global Artists Agency.

Filmography

Film

Television

Video games

References

External links

Living people
Male actors from Dundee
Scottish male film actors
Scottish male television actors
1969 births